Cheremkhovsky District is an administrative district, one of the thirty-three in Irkutsk Oblast, Russia. Municipally, it is incorporated as Cheremkhovsky Municipal District. It is located in the southwest of the oblast. Its administrative center is the town of Cheremkhovo (which is not administratively a part of the district). As of the 2010 Census, the total population of the district was 30,114.

History
The district was established in 1926.

Administrative and municipal status
Within the framework of administrative divisions, Cheremkhovsky District is one of the thirty-three in the oblast. The town of Cheremkhovo serves as its administrative center, despite being incorporated separately as an administrative unit with the status equal to that of the districts.

As a municipal division, the district is incorporated as Cheremkhovsky Municipal District. The Town of Cheremkhovo is incorporated separately from the district as Cheremkhovo Urban Okrug.

References

Notes

Sources

Districts of Irkutsk Oblast
States and territories established in 1926